Giordano Bruno and the Hermetic Tradition is a 1964 non-fiction book by British historian Frances A. Yates.  The book delves into the history of Hermeticism and its influence upon Renaissance philosophy and Giordano Bruno.

With the publication of Giordano Bruno and the Hermetic Tradition, Yates transformed Renaissance historiography. In it, she revealed the hermeticism with which the Renaissance was imbued, and the revived interest in mysticism, magic and Gnosticism of Late Antiquity that survived the Middle Ages. In the face of longstanding conventional interpretations, Yates suggested that the itinerant Catholic priest Giordano Bruno was burned at the stake in 1600 for espousing the Hermetic tradition rather than his affirmation of heliocentricity.

Reception
The book is cited by the bestselling British author Philip Pullman, as a central inspiration for his own writing.

Alan Charles Kors and  Edward Peters, the editors of the book Witchcraft in Europe, 400-1700: A Documentary History stated in the 2001 second edition of their collection of historical documents on the witchcraft hysteria that "this classic work [GBHT] remains" among the best of its kind on the subject.

See also
Renaissance magic
Renaissance humanism

References

1964 non-fiction books
Giordano Bruno
Philosophy books
Renaissance philosophy
Medieval philosophical literature
Renaissance humanism
Academic studies of ritual and magic